The 2011 UCI Mountain Bike Marathon World Championships was the 9th edition of the UCI Mountain Bike Marathon World Championships held in Montello, Italy.

Medal summary

Medal table

External links
Results

UCI Mountain Bike World Championships
UCI Mountain Bike Marathon World Championships
2011 UCI Mountain Bike Marathon World Championships
UCI Mountain Bike Marathon World Championships